Roger Tamba M'Pinda (born 13 August 1998) is a French professional footballer who plays as a defensive midfielder for Championnat National 2 club Saint-Malo.

Club career
He made his Austrian Football First League debut for WSG Wattens on 25 August 2017 in a game against SV Ried.

After a loan at NK Osijek and a short spell at Apollon Limassol, Tamba M'Pinda signed for Annecy in the Championnat National.

References

External links
 

Living people
1998 births
Footballers from Lyon
Association football midfielders
French footballers
2. Liga (Austria) players
Cypriot First Division players
First Football League (Croatia) players
Championnat National players
Championnat National 3 players
FC Bourgoin-Jallieu players
Juventus F.C. players
WSG Tirol players
NK Osijek players
Apollon Limassol FC players
FC Annecy players
US Saint-Malo players
French expatriate footballers
Expatriate footballers in Italy
Expatriate footballers in Austria
Expatriate footballers in Croatia
Expatriate footballers in Cyprus